The Miss Pennsylvania competition is the pageant that selects the representative for the state of Pennsylvania in the Miss America pageant. Pennsylvania, including early years' city representatives, has won the Miss America crown on five occasions.

Originally held in Hershey, the pageant moved to West Chester where pageants were held during the 1950s. The pageant was held in Altoona from 1974. In 1994, Easton was chosen as the new venue of the pageant and the date was shifted from June to May. In November 2008, the pageant was moved to the Pittsburgh area. In 2019, the competition moved to York, Pennsylvania.

In the fall of 2018, the Miss America Organization terminated the Miss Pennsylvania organization's license as well as licenses from Florida, Georgia, New Jersey, New York, Tennessee, and West Virginia.

Alysa Bainbridge of Leesport was crowned Miss Pennsylvania 2022 on June 18, 2022 at The Appell Center for Performing Arts in York. She competed at Miss America 2023 at the Mohegan Sun in Uncasville, Connecticut in December 2022.

Gallery of past titleholders

Results summary
The following is a visual summary of the past results of Miss Pennsylvania titleholders at the national Miss America pageants/competitions. The year in parentheses indicates the year of the national competition during which a placement and/or award was garnered, not the year attached to the contestant's state title.

Placements 
 Miss Americas: Ruth Malcomson (1924), Henrietta Leaver (1935), Rose Coyle (1936), Frances Marie Burke (1940), Evelyn Margaret Ay (1954)
 1st runners-up: Rosella Hannon (1941)
 2nd runners-up: Linda Olson (1973), Susan Spafford (2000)
 3rd runners-up: Barbara Sue Nager (1955), Maureen Wimmer (1972)
 4th runners-up: Marion Green (1923), Maggie Walker (1971), Tina Louise Thomas (1974)
 Top 4: Gladys Greenamyer (1922)
 Top 5: Kathleen Coyle (1927)
 Top 10: Dorothea Ditmer (1927), Emma Hammermeister (1943), Patricia Hunt (1953), Lois Janet Piercy (1960), Marie McLaughlin (1977), Lynn Carol Grote (1978), Carolyn Louise Black (1980), Michelle Kline (1990), Marla Wynne (1991), Melissa Jeka (2001), Nicole Brewer (2006), Emily Wills (2007), Katie Schreckengast (2018)
 Top 12: Lenore Pollock (1935), Jean McCool (1935), Helen Keaser (1935), Margie Dorie (1944)
 Top 13: Gloria Bair (1945)
 Top 15: Mildred Walker (1925), Anna Mae Reefer (1926), Anna Julia Zaker (1936), Bonnie Boyle (1936), Elaine Miller (1936), Kathryn Buckley (1938), Alberta Louise Carts (1940), Mildred Saha (1940), Lillian Handford (1947)
 Top 16: Eleanor Kramer (1946), Janice Murray (1951)
 Top 18: Geraldine Glassman (1933)
 Top 20: Rosalyn Menon (2002)

Awards

Preliminary awards
 Preliminary Lifestyle and Fitness: Evelyn Margaret Ay (1954), Emily Wills (2007)
 Preliminary Presentation: Rosalyn Menon (2002)
 Preliminary Talent: Rose Coyle (1936), Rosella Hannon (1941), Eleanor Kramer (1946), Jennie Rebecca Blatchford (1958), Lois Janet Piercy (1960), Maureen Wimmer (1972), Tina Louise Thomas (1974), Lynn Carol Grote (1978), Amanda Smith (2015)

Non-finalist awards
 Non-finalist Talent: Lorna Malcomson Ringler (1957), Judith Lynn McConnell (1966), Gale Veronica Rothwell (1967), Connie Harness (1976), Lea Schiazza (1986), Linda O'Boyle (1992), Candace Otto (2004), Rachel Brooks (2008), Kendria Perry (2009), Amanda Smith (2015)

Other awards
 Miss Congeniality: N/A
 Amateur Beauty Award: Gladys Greenamyer (1922)
 Bernie Wayne Performing Arts Award: Candace Otto (2004)
 Cavalier Scholarship: Katarina Sitaris (1988)
 Community Achievement Award: Rosalyn Menon (2002)
 Dr. David B. Allman Medical Scholarship: Charmaine Kowalski (1979), Shannon Doyle (2010)
 Equity and Justice Award Finalist: Meghan Sinisi (2022)
 Quality of Life Award Winners: Michelle Kline (1990)
 Quality of Life Award 2nd runners-up: Marla Wynne (1991)
 Roller Chair Parade (Intercity) Second Prize: Leah M. Knapp (1922) 
 Roller Chair Parade Third Prize: Marion Green (1923)
 Women in Business Scholarship Award: Meghan Sinisi (2022)

Winners

References

External links
 Miss Pennsylvania official website

Pennsylvania
Pennsylvania culture
Women in Pennsylvania
Recurring events established in 1921
Annual events in Pennsylvania
1921 establishments in Pennsylvania